Skopów  (Ukrainian: Скопів) is a village in the administrative district of Gmina Krzywcza, within Przemyśl County, Subcarpathian Voivodeship, in south-eastern Poland.

External links
Skopów (in Polish)

References

Villages in Przemyśl County